The Keystone State Wrestling Alliance is a professional wrestling promotion based out of Pittsburgh, Pennsylvania. Title reigns are  determined by professional wrestling matches.

The KSWA currently has four regular Championship Titles and one annual title. KSWA Heavyweight Championship, KSWA Tag Team Championship, KSWA Golden Triangle Championship, KSWA Five Star Championship and the Annual KSWA "Brawl Under the Bridge" Championship. This article will break down every title holder to hold the current titles, as well as the 4 former titles.

Current championships

KSWA Heavyweight Championship
Key

KSWA Tag Team Championship

KSWA Golden Triangle Championship

KSWA Five Star Championship

KSWA "Brawl Under the Bridge" Championship

Former Championships

KSWA Pittsburgh Heavyweight Championship

KSWA International Heavyweight Championship

KSWA Tri-State Heavyweight Championship

References

External links
Official KSWA Championship History

Professional wrestling champion lists
Keystone State Wrestling Alliance